The Rolls-Royce Cullinan is a full-sized luxury sport utility vehicle (SUV) manufactured by Rolls-Royce Motor Cars as the brand's first all-wheel drive vehicle. It is named after the Cullinan Diamond, the largest gem-quality rough diamond ever discovered.

The Cullinan sits above the Ghost and below the Phantom in Rolls-Royce's line, with a starting price in the United States of approximately US$325,000 (£255,000). It was unveiled in May 2018 at the Concorso d'Eleganza Villa d'Este.  In the US, it is not exempt from the Energy Tax Act because it is classified as a station wagon rather than an SUV.

Overview 
In 2017 it was reported that a design was in the works and that the name would be Cullinan. This was due to its competitors such as Bentley and Lamborghini venturing into the SUV business with the Bentayga and the Urus respectively.  At the 2015 Frankfurt Auto Show, Rolls-Royce's CEO Torsten Müller-Ötvös said that the SUV will be revealed in 2018 and be on the market in 2019.

The name "Cullinan" was confirmed by Rolls-Royce on 13 February 2018. It is named after the Cullinan diamond, the largest diamond ever found at 3100 carats.

According to own Statement of BMW AG, Rolls-Royce and similar institutions, this generation of automobile with combustion engine has a preview to an end until 2030, due the company only producing electric models.

As of 2019 the British carmaker claimed that despite expanding production and hiring more employees, there simply wasn't enough supply to satisfy the demand fuelled by brand loyalist and new-found female, younger buyers.

Design and Testing

Design 

Most of the Cullinan's exterior design has been adapted from the novel 8th generation Rolls-Royce Phantom such as the front grille and the headlights.

The interior features a new leather applied seats and wooden appliances. The car has  new leather camping seats known as the "cocktail suit" which is deployed from the luggage compartment. This car is the only Rolls-Royce to have a glass partition between the luggage compartment and the passenger compartment.

The Cullinan features various driving modes and among them, the off-road mode gives the car its full potential. It also has a dynamic suspension system that changes its height by 40 mm at off-road mode.

Testing phase 
The car is reported to have started its testing phase on 2 January 2016, and has since been seen testing on snow.

The final tests were conducted with the partnership of National Geographic in 2018 and it was tested in various terrains.

Specifications and Performance

Platform 
The Cullinan uses an aluminium spaceframe chassis; this is a version of Rolls-Royce's modular "Architecture of Luxury" platform. This platform made its debut in the Phantom VIII.

Suspension 
The Cullinan uses a double-wishbone front axle and a 5-link rear axle. It is fitted with self-levelling air suspension and electronically controlled dampers front and rear. It is also equipped with electrically actuated active anti-roll bars.

The Cullinan is also fitted with a stereo camera integrated into the front windscreen that scans the road ahead and adjusts the suspension proactively so as to improve ride quality. Michael Snell, Marketing Manager of the Americas for Rolls-Royce Motor Cars NA stated, "Even with the updated improvements to Cullinan's suspension and drive systems, the ride experience has not been compromised as the vehicle still retains our signature "Magic Carpet Ride" experience while you drive over any terrain."

Like the Phantom VIII, the Cullinan employs a four-wheel steering system to improve both maneuverability at low speeds and stability at higher speeds.

Powertrain 
The Cullinan is exclusively available with a twin-turbocharged 6.75-litre V12 engine. ZF's 8HP 8-speed automatic transmission is the Cullinan's sole gearbox option. The Cullinan uses a permanent all-wheel drive system.

Variants

Black Badge Cullinan

The Black Cullinan is a special edition of the Cullinan which is performance based.  Its exterior features are painted black (including the Spirit of Ecstasy) and its Interior consists of carbon fibre applications. The leather used in the interior is black and borders are coloured according to the exterior colour.

The current production car with the Rolls-Royce Black Badge marque along with this car is the Rolls-Royce Ghost Black Badge.

Cullinan Black Badge Capella
It is a one-off Rolls-Royce Cullinan. The Rolls-Royce Motor Cars claims that the car is based on a star brighter than the sun. The exterior has been painted bright yellow while the interior has a Starlight Headliner, first used in the Phantom Celestial.

See also
Mercedes-Maybach GLS 600
Bentley Bentayga

References

External links

Official global launch website
Rolls-Royce Motor Cars PressClub

Cullinan
Luxury sport utility vehicles
Full-size sport utility vehicles
Expanded length sport utility vehicles
Crossover sport utility vehicles
Vehicles with four-wheel steering
Cars introduced in 2018
2020s cars
Flagship vehicles